Otaua is a rural settlement in the Waikato District and Waikato region of New Zealand's North Island. It is located south of Waiuku and west of Aka Aka, on the northern side of the Waikato River. The Otaua area includes the Waikato North Head on the northern side of the Waikato River mouth, opposite Port Waikato to the south.

The Waikato North Head ironsand mine, just south of the settlement, produces up to 1.2 million tonnes of ironsand a year, for use in the New Zealand Steel mill at Glenbrook. The deposit is estimated to contain more than 150 million tonnes in total. The ironsand is processed on-site with a series of separation processes with river water, before the slurry is pumped to the Glenbrook mill through an 18-kilometre underground pipe.

The name Otaua is a contraction of Te Takanga-o-Tauaiwi, a reference to the falling of Tauaiwi, a descendant of Hotonui of the Tainui waka. Tauiwi was killed at Otaua by Tāmaki Māori and his body fell into a disused pit.

History

Pre-European history

In the mid-1700s, the area was settled by Ngāti Te Ata, an iwi formed by the marriage of Te Atairehia of Te Wai-o-Hua, and Tapaue, a Tainui warrior. The coast alongside the Tasman Sea was settled by Ngāti Kahukōkā. Maioro, south-west of Otaua near the shoreline, is the site of a Ngāti Kahukōkā pā. The pā was first settled in the 1200s, becoming fortified with palisades in the 1400s and 1500s.

European settlement century

Otaua developed into a European farming settlement in the 1890s, with a school opening in 1895. The 360m² Otaua community hall was built in 1898. It has since been extensively renovated with modern fittings, and now features an outdoor deck area and tennis courts.

Otaua Second World War Roll of Honour was unveiled on the hall on 21 September 1946, commemorating the 43 local residents who had served in the war, including three who had died. Several Otaua servicemen from both wars are also listed in the Waiuku War Memorial Hall, including three who aren't included in the Otaua Roll of Honour.

On 20 November 1954, the Otaua District War Memorial Bowling Green was formally opened across the road. It features a modest pavilion that was replaced in 1963.

The bowling green entrance is an arch, with a granite memorial plaque reading:

Education

The school opened in 1895 and held centennial celebrations in 1995.

References

Waikato District
Populated places in Waikato
Populated places on the Waikato River